Bebop scale is a term referring to the practice of adding a note (typically a chromatic passing tone) to any common seven tone scale in order to make it an eight tone scale. An eight tone scale is balanced, meaning that it contains an even number of notes (8), and an even number of notes enables the primary chord tones to continuously fall on the strong beats of "1 2 3 4" (downbeats). This is unlike common seven note scale (an odd quantity of notes) in which the chord tones do not all naturally fall on the beats "1 2 3 4" (downbeats). These bebop scales are frequently used in jazz improvisation. Jazz educator David Baker nicknamed these scales the 'bebop scales' because they were used often by jazz artists from the Bebop Era. These artists include Charlie Christian, Charlie Parker, Bud Powell, and Dizzy Gillespie, to name a few.

In general, bebop scales consist of traditional scales with an added passing tone, and when the scale is played from any chord tone (1 3 5 6 in major) and placed on any downbeat 1 2 3 or 4, downbeat, then all other chord tones (1 3 5 6 in major) will also continuously fall on downbeats 1 2 3 and 4. Chord tones on downbeats are characteristic of all strong melodies throughout musical history. The remaining notes in the scale (non-chord tones 2 4 5 and 7 in major) fall on the upbeats (the "+" counts between downbeats 1 2 3 and 4).

As such, generally, any scale of seven notes may be modified by the addition of an additional note to accomplish this same eight note balancing effect that enables chord tones to naturally stay on the beat.  The modifier "bebop" is reserved to indicate those scales most frequently used—and popularised—during the bebop era.

Bebop dominant scale 
The bebop dominant scale is derived from the Mixolydian mode and has a chromatic passing note added in between the flatted 7th (7) and the 8th root. The chord tones Root, 3rd, 5th, and 7th will naturally and continuously stay on the beat when played starting from a chord tone starting on a downbeat. Historically, in strong melody writing, chord tones are usually placed on the beats and nonchord tones are placed on the upbeats. The bebop scale helps enable this characteristic in melodic improvisation.

It has all the notes in both the major scale and the Mixolydian scale of the same root. This scale is often used over dominant seventh chords  and over II-V chord progressions.

Note that in bebop, according to Barry Harris, the dominant scale is played over the entire ii-V chord sequence. Harris explained there is no time to switch from a ii scale to a V scale. Thus, over a ii-V, such as | Dmi7 G7 |, according to Harris, a bop musician would simply play the G7 (bebop) scale.

Bebop major scale 
The bebop major scale, or what Barry Harris called the major sixth diminished scale, is derived from the Ionian mode (major scale) and has a chromatic passing note added (a 5) between the 5th and 6th degrees of the major scale. Adding the 5 note to the seven-note major scale makes it an even number, a balanced quantity of eight notes. This, means that the now balanced scale will enable the chord tones to stay on the beats which is historically a characteristic of strong melodies. The chord tones of the C major bebop scale are C E G and A (the C6 chord). The non-chord tones are considered D F Ab and B (2 4 5 and 7  which also happen to form an important diminished chord, see Barry Harris jazz theory).

Bebop melodic minor scale 
The bebop melodic minor scale, or what Barry Harris would call the minor sixth diminished scale, is derived from the ascending form of the melodic minor scale (jazz minor scale) and has a chromatic passing note between the 5th and 6th notes. Barry Harris further says that it is derived from a minor sixth chord (1 b3 5 6 of the scale), and a fully diminished chord from the second degree (2 4 b6 7 of the scale).

It has all the notes of both the ascending form of the melodic minor scale and the harmonic minor scale of the same root. This scale is often used over minor sixth chords.

These scales are listed in David N. Baker's books on bebop. They are also included, with the exception of the Dorian bebop scale, in Roni Ben-Hur's book Talk Jazz: A Comprehensive Collection of Bebop Studies, which is derived from the work of Barry Harris. Ben-Hur further elaborates on the concept of placing additional chromatic passing tones between other notes in the scales.

Bebop harmonic minor scale 
The bebop harmonic minor scale (or bebop natural minor scale, as listed in Mark Levine's The Drop 2 Book) is derived from the harmonic minor scale and has a chromatic passing note added (an additional 7) between the 6th and the 7th notes.

It contains all of the notes of both the harmonic minor scale and the natural minor scale (Aeolian mode) of the same root. It can be used on all three chords of a minor ii–V–I progression. It is the seventh mode of the bebop major scale: for instance, the C bebop harmonic minor scale has the same pitches as the E bebop major scale.

Seventh flat 5 diminished scale

The seventh flat 5 diminished scale (which is identical to Messiaen's sixth mode of limited transposition) is derived from the whole tone scale, with an added fourth and a natural seventh degree. It is also a combination of a dominant seventh with a flat fifth on the first degree, and a fully diminished chord on the second degree.

See also
Chord-scale system

References

Bibliography

Further reading 
Scott Black, How to Understand, Practice, and Use
David Baker, Jazz Improvisation, Alfred.
David Baker, Arranging and Composing, Alfred
Hewitt, Michael. 2013. Musical Scales of the World. The Note Tree. .
Mark Levine, The Drop 2 Book, Sher Music Co.
Mark Levine, The Jazz Theory Book, Sher Music Co.
Randy Halberstadt, Metaphors For The Musician, Sher Music Co.
J.Brent / S.Barkley, Modalogy – scales, modes & chords: the primordial building blocks of music, Hal Leonard Corp.

External links 
The Bebop Scale, jazzguitar.be
Jazz Lesson: Bebop Line Building, nyjazzacademy.com

Bebop
Heptatonic scales
Jazz terminology
Hemitonic scales
Tritonic scales